Åge Austheim (born 20 November 1983) is a Norwegian politician for the Progress Party.

He served as a deputy representative to the Parliament of Norway from Nordland during the terms 2005–2009, 2009–2013 and 2013–2017. In total he met during 60 days of parliamentary session. Outside of politics he is a physician in Kristiansund.

References

1983 births
Living people
Politicians from Kristiansund
Deputy members of the Storting
Progress Party (Norway) politicians
Møre og Romsdal politicians
21st-century Norwegian politicians